Çağlayan is a Turkish surname. In Turkish, çağlayan means a "cataract" in terms of the types of waterfalls. Notable people with the surname include:

 Armağan Çağlayan (born 1966), Turkish television producer
 Burhan Suat Çağlayan, Turkish politician and former Minister of Culture
 Hüseyin Çağlayan (born 1970), British Turkish Cypriot fashion designer
 Mesude Çağlayan (1918–2011), Turkish opera singer
 Zafer Çağlayan (born 1957), Turkish politician and former Minister of Economic Affairs
 Sevim Çağlayan, Turkish actress and Ottoman classical music singer

References

Turkish-language surnames

tr:Çağlayan